2001: A Space Travesty is a 2000 sci-fi comedy film directed by Allan A. Goldstein and starring Leslie Nielsen, Ophélie Winter, Peter Egan, and Ezio Greggio. The film has a few sequences parodying elements of 2001: A Space Odyssey, but is not focused on parodying that film alone. Filming took place in Los Angeles, California.

Plot
Marshal Richard "Dick" Dix, a special detective, saves a fast food chain restaurant from a terrorist hostage situation, much to the displeasure of the police chief. He drives away and back to the police station, where he meets his boss, who is with a police worker, Cassandra Menage. She retells her experience of the cloning of the President of the United States of America, Bill Clinton, who remains unnamed throughout the film.

Dix is sent to the cloning facility, a Moon base called Vegan. He causes a mayhem on the way there, reaches Vegan and is met by Lt. Bradford Shitzu at the security check. On the way to meet the main suspect in the cloning, Dr. Griffin Pratt, Dix experiences strange happenings throughout the colony involving certain Aliens who live there.

During a very strange incident involving an Alien about to explode, Dix meets Capt. Valentino DiPasquale, with whom he will share his quarters. Dix and Shitzu get to Dr. Pratt's quarters, and talk to him. Shitzu leaves, and Pratt takes Dix on a tour of his cloning facility. While on the tour, he meets Dr. Uschi Künstler, with whom he takes the elevator to meet Ms. Menage. Dr. Künstler deserts the two, and they make their way to a party where the suspects may be.

Pratt and Menage have dinner, while Dix has a bizarre escapade with Pratt's toupe. He leaves the party and goes to his quarters with Valentino. There he shows him his huge array of disguises. Dix gets a phone call from Ms. Menage that they are about to raid Pratt's quarters. Dix destroys his Vegan model and spreads paint all over the place. Then he stumbles on the radio, and it starts playing the cancan very loudly.

Pratt comes back to his room, only to discover that Dix escaped. He goes to his apartment and threatens him. Dix tells Menage, and soon enough, Menage gets abducted by Pratt's goons. Pratt pretends to help Dix find the President and rescue Ms. Menage, but Pratt's goons trap them. Ms. Menage uses her martial arts skills, and the President, Dix, and Menage escape back to Earth. The President they rescued is then replaced with the president in the White House, and suddenly Dix finds out that he put the clone in the White House.

They find out that Dix's boss is also with Pratt. Dix, the President, Menage, Valentino, Shitzu and Künstler go to a concert by the Three Tenors, who are singing Village People songs. The presidents are involved in an onstage fight, and the whole concert is ruined by Shitzu's fumbling with the control panel. Then Künstler double-crosses Dix, and reveals she is actually an alien. After Menage kills her, the president is replaced, and Menage goes with Dix to a restaurant for a date.

Cast

 Leslie Nielsen as Marshal "Dick" Dix
 Ophélie Winter as Cassandra Menage
 Peter Egan as Dr. Griffin Pratt
 Damian Mason as Mr. President
 Ezio Greggio as Capt. Valentino Di Pasquale
 Pierre Edwards as Lt. Bradford Shitzu
 Alexandra Kamp as Dr. Uschi Künstler
 David Fox as Secretary Osgood
 Michel Perron as Famous Tenor #1
 Teresa Barnwell as Mrs. President

Reception
The website Need Coffee praised Nielsen's comedy style, despite the film's silliness. "If you're just in the mood for silly, puerile humor (and we all are, sometimes), or if you're under thirteen and the word 'penis' sends you into gails [sic] of laughter, then check this one out. Otherwise, skip it and check out something with a bit more sophistication." Jason James from The Nut Gallery gave the film only one star out of five, stating: "Overall I am not that big of a fan of spoof movies to begin with so it would have to be pretty special for me to like it. Even with that this is still not even that good of a spoof movie making it even harder to watch." Richard Scheib from Moria.co also gave the film a very poor review, nominating it the "Worst Film of 2001".

References

External links
 
 
 

2000 films
2000 comedy films
2000 science fiction films
2000s English-language films
2000s parody films
2000s science fiction comedy films
American parody films
American science fiction comedy films
Cultural depictions of Bill Clinton
Cultural depictions of Hillary Clinton
Cultural depictions of Luciano Pavarotti
Films about extraterrestrial life
Films directed by Allan A. Goldstein
Moon in film
American space adventure films
2000s American films